This is a list of Members of Parliament (MPs) elected to the Jatiya Sangsad (National Parliament of Bangladesh) from 300 Bangladeshi constituencies for the 11th Parliament of Bangladesh.

It includes both MPs elected at the 2018 general election, held on 30 December 2018, and nominated women's members for reserved seat and those subsequently elected in by-elections.

Members

Political parties

Elected members

Members of the Reserved Women's Seat

References 

Members of the Jatiya Sangsad by term